Eugene Farrell (born 21 April 1973) is an Irish sprinter. He competed in the men's 400 metres at the 1996 Summer Olympics.

References

1973 births
Living people
Athletes (track and field) at the 1996 Summer Olympics
Irish male sprinters
Olympic athletes of Ireland
Place of birth missing (living people)